Kaningi (Kaning'i) is a Bantu language spoken in Gabon. Speakers live in villages scattered among other peoples; the Bongo pygmies speak a distinct dialect.

References

Mbete languages
Languages of the Republic of the Congo
Languages of Gabon